Thomas Patrick Gorman (born December 16, 1957) is an American former professional baseball pitcher, who played in Major League Baseball (MLB) for the Montreal Expos, New York Mets, Philadelphia Phillies, and San Diego Padres, in all or part of seven seasons, from  through . His Mets teammate Keith Hernandez nicknamed him "Gorfax," a portmanteau of "Gorman" and "Koufax."

Born in Portland, Oregon, Gorman attended Woodburn High School in Woodburn, Oregon where he won a state high school baseball championship. He walked on to the college baseball team at Gonzaga University and played there from 1977–1980. In 1995, he was inducted to the Gonzaga Athletic Hall of Fame. Gorman was drafted by the Montreal Expos, in the 4th round (98th overall) of the 1980 Major League Baseball draft.

Over the course of Gorman’s MLB career, his stat line included 213 innings pitched, 52 total chances handled (12 putouts, 40 assists), without committing an error, for a perfect 1.000 fielding percentage.

As of 2017, Gorman is the pitching coach at Oregon City High School. Under Gorman’s guidance, the team won the 2012 6A State Championship.

References

External links

Tom Gorman at Ultimate Mets Database
Metro Baseball Academy Coaching Staff 

1957 births
Living people
American expatriate baseball players in Canada
Baseball players from Portland, Oregon
Gonzaga Bulldogs baseball players
Las Vegas Stars (baseball) players
Major League Baseball pitchers
Memphis Chicks players
Montreal Expos players
New York Mets players
Philadelphia Phillies players
San Diego Padres players
Tacoma Tigers players
Tidewater Tides players
Wichita Aeros players